Music Kills Me is a 2002 album by Rinôçérôse.

Track listing 
 "Le Rock Summer"
 "Music Kills Me"
 "It's Time To Go Now!"
 "Lost Love"
 "Dead Flowers"
 "Résurrection D'une Idôle Pop"
 "Professeur Suicide"
 "No We Are Not Experienced !"
 "Brian Jones : Last Picture"
 "Obsèques D'un Guitar Hero"
 "Dead Can Dance"
 "Highway To Heaven"

References

2002 albums
Rinôçérôse albums
V2 Records albums